The 2018 Glasgow Trophy was a professional tennis tournament played on indoor hard courts. It was the first edition of the tournament which was part of the 2018 ATP Challenger Tour. It took place in Glasgow, United Kingdom, between 28 April and 6 May 2018.

Singles main-draw entrants

Seeds

1 Rankings are as of 23 April 2018.

Other entrants
The following players received wildcards into the singles main draw:
  Lloyd Glasspool
  Jonathan Gray
  Aidan McHugh
  James Ward

The following player received entry into the singles main draw using a protected rating:
  Riccardo Bellotti

The following players received entry from the qualifying draw:
  Daniel Brands
  Dan Evans
  Harri Heliövaara
  Robin Kern

Champions

Singles

 Lukáš Lacko def.  Luca Vanni 4–6, 7–6(7–3), 6–4.

Doubles

 Gerard Granollers /  Guillermo Olaso def.  Scott Clayton /  Jonny O'Mara 6–1, 7–5,

External links
 Official website

2018 ATP Challenger Tour
2018
2018 in Scottish sport
April 2018 sports events in the United Kingdom
May 2018 sports events in the United Kingdom
2010s in Glasgow